Hermann Kupfner (born 31 December 1957) is an Austrian sailor. He competed in the Tornado event at the 1980 Summer Olympics.

References

External links
 

1957 births
Living people
Austrian male sailors (sport)
Olympic sailors of Austria
Sailors at the 1980 Summer Olympics – Tornado
Place of birth missing (living people)